Verus was a well-known gladiator during the reigns of the Emperors Vespasian and Titus in the later part of the 1st century. His combat with Priscus was the highlight of the opening day of the games conducted by Titus to inaugurate the Flavian Amphitheatre (later the Colosseum) in AD 80, and
recorded in a laudatory poem by Martial — the only detailed description of a gladiatorial fight that has survived to the present day. Both gladiators were declared victors of the combat, and were awarded their freedom by the Emperor in a unique outcome. 

Martial, Liber de Spectaculis, XXIX:

Notes
The life and fate of Verus is the basis of the BBC documentary drama "Colosseum: Rome's Arena of Death" a.k.a. "Colosseum: A Gladiator's Story" (2003). 

Roman gladiators
1st-century Romans